Severin, Séverin or Severinus may refer to:

People
 Severin (given name)
 Severin (surname)

Places
 Caraș-Severin County, a county in Romania
 Severin County, a defunct county in Romania that was merged into the present Caraş-Severin County
 Drobeta-Turnu Severin, a city in Romania, capital of the Mehedinţi County
 Severin, Bjelovar-Bilogora County, Croatia
 Severin na Kupi, Primorje-Gorski Kotar County, Croatia
 Severin, Germany, a municipality in Mecklenburg-Vorpommern, Germany
 Banate of Severin, a territory in the Kingdom of Hungary

Other
 Severin Elektro GmbH, a German electric appliance manufacturer
 Severin Training Center, a subsidiary of the Danish cooperative FDB
 Severin Films, an American film production and distribution company

See also
 Saint Severin (disambiguation)
 Severian (disambiguation)
 Severina (disambiguation)
 Severine (disambiguation)
 Severino, an Italian, Spanish, and Portuguese variant of the name, sometimes also used as a surname
 Søren (given name), a Danish and Norwegian variant of the name
 Severn, a river in the United Kingdom